Ngwe Lwin's slender gecko (Hemiphyllodactylus ngwelwini) is a species of gecko. It is endemic to Myanmar.

Etymology
The  specific name, ngwelwini, is in honor of Ngwe Lwin, Northern Programme Manager of Fauna & Flora International, Myanmar Programme for his supportive and invaluably instrumental in facilitating herpetological field surveys in Myanmar.

Geographic range
This species is known from three localities across a distance of approximately 29 km from Pwe Hla Village in the north to the Thayeumin and Myintmahati caves in the south, Shan State.

References

Hemiphyllodactylus
Reptiles described in 2020
Reptiles of Myanmar
Endemic fauna of Myanmar
Taxa named by Larry Lee Grismer
Taxa named by Perry L. Wood
Taxa named by Evan Quah
Taxa named by Myint Kyaw Thura
Taxa named by Jamie R. Oaks
Taxa named by Aung Lin